The 1956 San Diego State Aztecs football team represented San Diego State College during the 1956 NCAA College Division football season.

San Diego State competed in the California Collegiate Athletic Association (CCAA). The team was led by head coach Paul Governali, in his first year, and played home games at both Aztec Bowl and Balboa Stadium. They finished the season with four wins, three losses and two ties (4–3–2, 2–1 CCAA).

Schedule

Team players in the NFL
No San Diego State players were selected in the 1957 NFL Draft.

Notes

References

San Diego State
San Diego State Aztecs football seasons
San Diego State Aztecs football